Portrait of a General is a c.1550 portrait of an unknown general by the Venetian artist Titian. It is now in the Gemäldegalerie Alte Meister (Kassel).

Sources

General
General
1550 paintings
Paintings in the collection of the Gemäldegalerie Alte Meister (Kassel)